Parajuli/ee  or Parajuly is a surname found in Nepal. It is a toponymic family name from Parajul village in Dailekh district, which lies in two former VDCs: Awal Parajul and Dada Parajul. Notable people with the surname include:

Gopal Parajuli, Nepalese poet, and Madan Puraskar winner 
Gopal Prasad Parajuli, Chief Justice of Nepal
Hari Parajuli, Nepalese minister and politician
Prajwal Parajuly, Indian writer of Nepalese origin; noted for The Gurkha's Daughter

See also
Awal Parajul, village of Parajuli
Dada Parajul, village of Parajuli

References

Ethnic groups in Nepal
Bahun
Nepali-language surnames
Khas surnames